The Sergey Kuchkin (former Georgiy Dimitrov) is a Valerian Kuybyshev-class (92-016, OL400) Soviet/Russian river cruise ship, cruising in the Volga basin. The ship was built by Slovenské Lodenice at their shipyard in Komárno, Czechoslovakia, and entered service in 1979. At 3,950 tonnes, Sergey Kuchkin is one of the world's biggest river cruise ships. Her sister ships are Valerian Kuybyshev, Mikhail Frunze, Feliks Dzerzhinskiy, Fyodor Shalyapin, Mstislav Rostropovich, Aleksandr Suvorov, Semyon Budyonnyy and Georgiy Zhukov. Sergey Kuchkin is currently operated by Vodohod, a Russian river cruise line. Her home port is currently Nizhny Novgorod.

Features
The ship has two restaurants, three bars, solarium, sauna and resting area.

See also
 List of river cruise ships

References

External links

Теплоход Сергей Кучкин 
Project 92-016 

1979 ships
River cruise ships
Ships built in Czechoslovakia